Odoodee (Ododei) is a Trans–New Guinea language of New Guinea, spoken in the plains east of the Strickland River. It is also called Tomu, after the river along which it is found, and Nomad.

References

Languages of Western Province (Papua New Guinea)
Languages of Southern Highlands Province
East Strickland languages